Deanna Jackson (born December 15, 1979) is an American professional women's basketball player. Jackson attended college at the University of Alabama at Birmingham. She competed with USA Basketball as a member of the 2000  Jones Cup Team that won the Gold in Taipei.

UAB  statistics

Source

Notes

1979 births
Living people
All-American college women's basketball players
American expatriate basketball people in China
American women's basketball players
Basketball players from Alabama
Chicago Sky players
Cleveland Rockers players
Forwards (basketball)
Guangdong Vermilion Birds players
Indiana Fever players
People from Brewton, Alabama
Sportspeople from Selma, Alabama
UAB Blazers women's basketball players